Feuillet is a corregimiento in La Chorrera District, Panamá Oeste Province, Panama with a population of 2,669 as of 2010. Its population as of 1990 was 1,372; its population as of 2000 was 1,745.

References

Corregimientos of Panamá Oeste Province